Two Mundos Magazine is a quarterly, bilingual (English/Spanish) lifestyle and entertainment magazine based in Miami with distribution in South Florida, Washington, D.C., New York City, Los Angeles, Bolivia, Argentina, Paraguay and Spain. Its genre in bookstands is Bilingual Lifestyle Publications.

It was founded in 2003 by Enerdesigns Media Group, Inc. and is a high-end glossy lifestyle magazine, 9x11 with over 120 pages.

References

External links 
 Two Mundos Magazine
 The Washington Post business video
 Mondo Times report

Lifestyle magazines published in the United States
Quarterly magazines published in the United States
English-language magazines
Magazines established in 2003
Magazines published in Florida
Mass media in Miami
Spanish-language magazines
Spanish-language mass media in Florida
Entertainment magazines published in the United States
2003 establishments in Florida